Carlos Moreno (born 16 April 1959 in Colombia) is a Franco-Colombian urbanist and Sorbonne University professor.

Career 
He is mainly known for his contribution to the 15-Minute City concept.

The City Diplomacy Lab of Columbia University, appointed Moreno as a member of its scientific board.

Moreno is a former member of the M-19 movement.

Distinctions 
 The Spanish private sector for sustainable mobility, grouped in the "Plataforma de Empresas Para La Movilidad Sostenible" to Carlos Moreno for the 15-Minute City project.
 He was awarded the rank of Chevalier of the Order of the Legion of Honour in Paris in 2010 and the 2019 Foresight Medal by the French Academy of Architecture.
 On 4 October 2021, World Habitat Day announced the Obel Award for his contribution to 15 Minute City.
 In March 2022, Carlos Moreno became an ambassador for the French Pavilion of the world's largest ecological, economic and cultural gathering Floriade, which will take place in the Netherlands from 14 April to 9 October 2022 under the theme "Growing Green Cities".

References

1959 births
Living people
Colombian emigrants to France
Colombian academics
French academics
Recipients of the Legion of Honour
Sustainable urban planning
19th of April Movement members
Academic staff of Paris-Sorbonne University